Kafr El Battikh is a city in the Damietta Governorate, Egypt. Its population was estimated at about 44,700 people in 2018.

History 
The older name of the town was Bura, which comes from a Coptic name for grey mullet.

The city was an important fishing town and got a new name when its production changed to watermelons in the Ottoman times. Yaqut mentions, aside from the fish, turbans as its other claim to fame. Bura was for a short time captured by the Crusaders in 1213.

References 

Populated places in Damietta Governorate